Sebastonyma  perbella is a species of grass skipper in the family Hesperiidae. It is found in China.

References

Hesperiinae